Go Lala Go! is a 2010 Chinese romantic comedy film directed by Xu Jinglei. Film producer Patrick S. Cunningham collaborated with Xu Jinglei, and this film is considered one of the most successful collaborations between a Chinese director and American producer.

About 
Go Lala Go! was about a Chinese woman in Beijing who learns how to balance a relationship and professional work in a work place. It was directed by Xu Jinglei, who also stars as the title character. The film is based on a novel, Du Lala's Promotion, by Li Ke. Other actors in the film include Stanley Huang and Karen Mok. 

The costumes for Go Lala Go! were designed by Patricia Field, which caused the South China Morning Post to make comparisons to the American television series, Sex in the City which was also costumed by Field.

Go Lala Go! was released to Mainland Chinese audiences on 15 April 2010, where it competed for ticket sales with the American remake, Clash of the Titans.

After the success of "Go Lala Go!", Xu Jinglei directed another film Dear Enemy and co-starred with Stanley Huang again. The film is said to be like an updated and improved version of "Go Lala Go!"

Reception
Patrick Frater of Variety called the film "a precursor to the current wave of Chinese contemporary romance films."

Sequel
A sequel, Go Lala Go 2, was released on 4 December 2015.

See also
Dear Enemy
Go Lala Go 2

References

External links
  Go Lala Go!@Sina Entertainment Official Website
 
 Review on Twitchfilm.net 
 Review on beyondhollywood.com

2010 romantic comedy films
2010 films
Chinese romantic comedy films
Films directed by Xu Jinglei
2010s Mandarin-language films
DMG Entertainment films
Films based on Chinese novels